Air Vice Marshal David Joseph Dunlop,  (born 11 February 1949) is a retired officer of the Royal Australian Air Force (RAAF). He is married to another retired officer, Air Vice Marshal Julie Hammer.

Dunlop was awarded a Conspicuous Service Cross in 1995 in recognition of service to the RAAF in the field of F-111 aircraft operations.

References

1949 births
Australian aviators
Living people
People from Brisbane
Recipients of the Conspicuous Service Cross (Australia)
Royal Australian Air Force air marshals
Military personnel from Brisbane